Benoît Cauet (born 2 May 1969) is a French professional football manager and former player, who played as a midfielder.

Playing career 
Cauet was born in Châtellerault. He won the Ligue 1 in 1989 and 1990 with Marseille and in 1995 with Nantes. He also won the Coupe de France in 1989 with Marseille and the UEFA Cup in 1998 with Internazionale F.C., as well as the Bulgarian A Professional Football Group in 2005 with CSKA Sofia. He appeared in the 1998 UEFA Cup Final as a substitute. In spite of his qualities as a player, he was never selected for the French national team at international level.

Style of play 
Cauet was a strong, dynamic, tenacious, and hard-working two-way midfielder, with a solid technique, who was known for his combative playing style and movement off the ball, as well as his ability to link-up with other midfielders and start attacking plays. Usually a defensive or central midfielder, he was regarded for his tactical intelligence and qualities as a ball-winner, although he was also capable of playing on the left flank, as well as in a more offensive midfield role.

Coaching career

Inter Milan 
Cauet worked as a coach in Inter Milan's youth system from 2011 to 2016. He would also become a scout there from 2016 to 2018.

Concarneau 
From 2019 to 2020, Cauet worked as manager of Concarneau.

Châteauroux 
Cauet was briefly Châteauroux manager from 1 January to 9 March 2021. With the club facing relegation, he replaced Nicolas Usaï in the role, but was sacked following the purchase of La Berichonne by Saudi prince Abdullah bin Musa'ad bin Abdulaziz Al Saud and his United World Group.

Honours 
Marseille
Ligue 1: 1988–89, 1989–90 
Coupe de France: 1988–89

Nantes
Ligue 1: 1994–95

Inter Milan
UEFA Cup: 1997–98

CSKA Sofia
Bulgarian A Group: 2004–05

Individual
Pirata d'Oro (Internazionale Player Of The Year): 1999

References

External links 
 
  TuttoCalciatori.net
 
 Benoît Cauet at pari-et-gagne.com

1969 births
Living people
Sportspeople from Vienne
French footballers
Footballers from Nouvelle-Aquitaine
Association football midfielders
UEFA Cup winning players
Ligue 1 players
Serie A players
First Professional Football League (Bulgaria) players
Swiss Challenge League players
Olympique de Marseille players
Stade Malherbe Caen players
FC Nantes players
Paris Saint-Germain F.C. players
Inter Milan players
Torino F.C. players
Como 1907 players
SC Bastia players
PFC CSKA Sofia players
FC Sion players
French football managers
LB Châteauroux managers
French expatriate footballers
French expatriate sportspeople in Italy
Expatriate footballers in Italy
French expatriate sportspeople in Bulgaria
Expatriate footballers in Bulgaria
French expatriate sportspeople in Switzerland
Expatriate footballers in Switzerland
Inter Milan non-playing staff
Association football coaches